Great Yarmouth Carmelite Friary in Norfolk, England, was founded in 1276 by the White Friars or Carmelites in the reign of Edward I and dedicated to St. Mary.

From 1430 to 1455, a John Tylney was prior. On 1 April 1509, the church and convent burnt down. In 1538 the friary was suppressed by Richard Yngworth, and in 1544 the land was granted to Thomas Denton and Robert Nottingham.

A 17th-century Grade II listed building now stands on the site at 6-12 George Street, Great Yarmouth.

See also

References

External links
 
 
http://www.localhistories.org/yarmouth.html

Monasteries in Norfolk
Great Yarmouth
1276 establishments in England
Christian monasteries established in the 13th century
1538 disestablishments in England
Carmelite monasteries in England